Jorge Arana Arana (born 15 April 1960) is a Mexican politician from the Institutional Revolutionary Party. From 2009 to 2012 he served as Deputy of the LXI Legislature of the Mexican Congress representing Jalisco.

References

1960 births
Living people
Politicians from Jalisco
Institutional Revolutionary Party politicians
21st-century Mexican politicians
University of Guadalajara alumni
20th-century Mexican politicians
Municipal presidents in Jalisco
Members of the Congress of Jalisco
Deputies of the LXI Legislature of Mexico
Members of the Chamber of Deputies (Mexico) for Jalisco